The P.G. Garodia School is an Indian Certificate of Secondary Education(ICSE) board-based high school located in Mumbai, India. Founded in 1969 in a makeshift classroom, the school began with 7 students. By 2013, enrollment had increased to over 2,500.

The school consists of four houses:

External  links
 School web site

Schools in Mumbai